Waskom High School is a public high school located in Waskom, Texas USA. It is located in western Harrison County on the Texas-Louisiana border and classified as a 3A school by the UIL. In 2015, the school was rated "Met Standard" by the Texas Education Agency.

Notable alumni
Jonathan Council, c/o 2005, 2008-2009 ASC All-Conference Center for the East Texas Baptist University Tigers
Dr. Jeremy Chance, Dentist and Owner of Dental Associates of Houston

Athletics
The Waskom Wildcats compete in the following sports - 

Baseball
Basketball
Cross Country
Football
Powerlifting
Soccer
Softball
Track and Field
Volleyball

State titles
Football 
2014 (3A/D2), 2015(3A/D2)

2014 Texas State 3A Division II Champions.
Waskom beat Newton HS from Newton, TX 41-22 on Thursday December 18, 2014. This was Waskom's first State Championship appearance in football and their first championship. They were coached by Head Coach Whitney Keeling. RB Kevin Johnson was named the Offensive MVP with 106 yards rushing on 11 carries. RB Junebug Johnson added 92 yards and a touchdown on 8 carries. QB Trace Carter added 77 yards and a touchdown on 17 carries. Chan Aime, named the Defensive MVP, added 11 yards rushing with a touchdown. Aime also had 24 tackles, a forced fumble, and returned a kickoff 88 yards for a touchdown.

2015 Texas State 3A DIVISION II Champions.
Waskom beat Franklin HS from Franklin, TX 33-21 on Thursday December 17, 2015. This was Waskom's second State Championship. They have a current win streak of 31 straight games. They won back to back in 14' and 15'. They were coached by Head Coach Whitney Keeling. The Wildcats are 45-2 since 2013. Chan Aime was named the Offensive MVP and had 29 rushes for 257 yards and 3 TDs. He also added one reception for 30 yards. QB Dylan Harkrider had 11 rushes for 73 yards and a TD, while going 6 of 11 passing for 86 yards and a TD. LB Mike Reason took home the Defensive MVP award. He had a team high 13 tackles and a fumble recovery.

Baseball 
1980(1A)

State Finalists
Baseball 
1981(2A)

State Semifinalist
Football 
2013(2A/D2), 2014(3A/D2), 2015(3A/D2)

Regional Champions
Football
2013(2A/D2), 2014(3A/D2), 2015(3A/D2)

References

External links
Waskom ISD

Schools in Harrison County, Texas
Public high schools in Texas